Gaztaf-e Sofla (also Romanized as Gazţāf-e Soflá; also known as Gaz Şāf-e Soflá and Gazţāf-e Pā’īn) is a village in Hendudur Rural District, Sarband District, Shazand County, Markazi Province, Iran. At the 2006 census, its population was 16, in 4 families.

References 

Populated places in Shazand County